The Little Osage River is an  tributary of the Osage River in eastern Kansas and western Missouri in the United States.  Via the Osage and Missouri rivers, it is part of the watershed of the Mississippi River.

The name was derived from the Osage Nation, whose traditional territory encompassed this area.

Course
The Little Osage rises in Kansas in northeastern Allen County at the confluence of the North and Middle Forks. The stream flows southeast into Bourbon County where the South Fork joins the stream and the stream turns and flows to the east. The stream turns sharply south. It is crossed by Kansas 65 to the east of Xenia. The stream meanders eastward passing north of Fulton, and under U.S. Route 69, where it enters northwestern Vernon County, Missouri. In Vernon County the stream passes just north of Stotesbury and on to pass under U.S. Route 71 north of Horton and through the Four Rivers Conservation Area and is joined by the Marmaton River.  

The areas to the east of the Marmaton River confluence are within what is now the flooded area of the Harry S Truman Reservoir.

See also
List of Kansas rivers
List of Missouri rivers

References

External links

Rivers of Kansas
Rivers of Missouri
Rivers of Allen County, Kansas
Rivers of Anderson County, Kansas
Rivers of Bourbon County, Kansas
Rivers of Bates County, Missouri
Rivers of Vernon County, Missouri
Tributaries of the Missouri River